Francesco Locatelli (9 March 1920 – 12 December 1978) was an Italian racing cyclist. He won the 1949 edition of the Tour de Pologne.

References

External links
 

1920 births
1978 deaths
Italian male cyclists
Cyclists from the Province of Lecco